Bob Woolston (born 23 May 1968) was an English cricketer. He was a right-handed batsman and a left-arm slow bowler who played for Somerset. He was born in Enfield, London.

Woolston made one first-class appearance for Somerset during the 1987 season, having made Second XI appearances for Middlesex, Worcestershire and Somerset. In the only first-class innings in which he played, he was trapped LBW by Alan Warner.

Woolston made an appearance in a miscellaneous match against Glamorgan, though he did not contribute with either the bat or the ball.

External links
Bob Woolston at Cricket Archive 

1968 births
Living people
English cricketers
Somerset cricketers